Adobe Encore (previously Adobe Encore DVD) is a DVD authoring software tool produced by Adobe Systems and targeted at professional video producers. Video and audio resources may be used in their current format for development, allowing the user to transcode them to MPEG-2 video and Dolby Digital audio upon project completion. DVD menus can be created and edited in Adobe Photoshop using special layering techniques. Adobe Encore does not support writing to a Blu-ray Disc using AVCHD 2.0.

Encore is bundled with Adobe Premiere Pro CS6. Adobe Encore CS6 was the last release. While Premiere Pro CC has moved to the Creative Cloud, Encore has now been discontinued.

Licensing 
All forms of Adobe Encore use a proprietary licensing system from its developer, Adobe Systems. Versions 1.0 and 1.5 required a separate license fee (rather than making 1.5 available as a free update). Version 3, also known as CS3, was sold only in bundle with Premiere CS3. Encore CS4, CS5, CS5.5 and CS6 were only sold in the Premiere Pro CS4, CS5, CS5.5 and CS6 bundles, respectively.  Adobe CC subscribers no longer have access to Adobe Encore CS6. Adobe Encore is not included with Premiere Pro CC.

See also 
 Video editing software
 Adobe Creative Cloud

References

External links
 Adobe Encore DVD Version History/Changelog
 Adobe Encore 1.5.1 Download Page
 Adobe Encore Download Page

Encore
Encore
Adobe Encore DVD
Encore
MacOS multimedia software
Windows multimedia software
2003 software